The Bow River is a river in Alberta, Canada. It begins within the Canadian Rocky Mountains and winds through the Alberta foothills onto the prairies, where it meets the Oldman River, the two then forming the South Saskatchewan River. These waters ultimately flow through the Nelson River into Hudson Bay. The Bow River runs through the city of Calgary, taking in the Elbow River at the historic site of Fort Calgary near downtown. The Bow River pathway, developed along the river's banks, is considered a part of Calgary's self-image.

First Nations made varied use of the river for sustenance before settlers of European origin arrived, such as using its valleys in the buffalo hunt.

The river is an important source of water for irrigation and drinking water. Between the years 1910 and 1960, the Bow River and its tributaries were engineered to provide hydroelectric power, primarily for Calgary's use. This significantly altered the river's flow and certain ecosystems.

Course

The river's source is from the Bow Glacier, which is part of the Wapta Icefield. The outflow from this source flows into Bow Lake in the Canadian Rockies. It flows south to the village of Lake Louise then turns east and flows through the town of Banff and through Canmore. The Ghost Lake reservoir is formed upstream from the town of Cochrane. The Bow flows eastward to the city of Calgary; it continues on to form the South Saskatchewan River when the Bow joins with the Oldman River near Grassy Lake in southern Alberta. It reaches the Hudson Bay through the Saskatchewan River, Lake Winnipeg, and Nelson River.

Communities along the Bow include Lake Louise, Banff, Canmore, Cochrane, Calgary, and Arrowwood. The Bow Falls are on the river's course, near Banff.

History

First Nations
The fur trader James Gaddy and the Hudson's Bay Company explorer David Thompson are traditionally considered to be the first people of European origin to see the Bow River. They camped along the Bow with a group of Piikani during the 1787–88 winter. Before they arrived, First Nations populations had lived in the Bow region for thousands of years. Among them were the Nakoda, Tsuu Tʼina, and the Blackfoot Confederacy, consisting of the Kainai, Piikanai, and Siksika peoples.  The Kutenai had migrated westward, possibly in the early eighteenth century, but still occasionally ventured into the Bow region to hunt bison.

First Nations used the river's valleys for the buffalo hunt, in which herds of buffalo were driven over cliffs or into valleys where they could be killed more easily with bows and arrows. Of all the First Nations groups that lived in the Bow River area, only the Nakoda fished the river regularly. While other groups likely caught fish during harder times, they primarily hunted buffalo during the summer season when fishing would have been most plentiful. The river's water naturally attracted game, which the First Nations men also hunted, while women gathered the roots, nuts and berries and processed them for food. The river's game, its local sources for firewood, and its valleys' shelter made the river a common camp location for First Nations during the prairie winters. The danger of crossing the river meant it was a natural boundary for First Nations. The two main fords of the lower Bow River, Blackfoot Crossing and a ford near the Bow's confluence with the Elbow River (where today's central Calgary developed), became important gathering points for First Nations to exchange goods and celebrate festivities. Blackfoot Crossing was used by the Siksika as a winter campsite and is today a part of their reserve.

Fur traders began to move to the Bow River region following Thompson's expedition, but the river was not used extensively in the fur trade. First Nations already weakened by declining buffalo numbers and disease were further devastated by the introduction of the whisky trade. Fort Whoop-Up was established in 1869, and whisky traders were active along the Bow River during the 1870s. To stop these operations, the recently formed North-West Mounted Police (later the RCMP) established Fort Calgary in 1875 at the confluence of the Elbow River and the Bow.

In order to proceed with railway construction through present-day Alberta and an orderly settlement of the Bow region, the government sought to extinguish title of First Nations to specific lands, and negotiated to do so through treaties. With bison numbers declining and white settlers becoming increasingly common in the region, the Nakoda, Tsuu Tʼina, Kainai, Piikanai, and Siksika met with representatives of the Canadian government at Blackfoot Crossing on the Bow River and signed Treaty 7 on 22 September 1877, ceding lands in exchange for defined reserves.  From the perspective of the Canadian government, these groups had surrendered all their land privileges outside their reserves. The reserves of the Nakoda, Tsuu Tʼina, and Siksika were established along the Bow River.

Hydroelectric development, 1910–1960

Calgary was growing rapidly after 1900. The city businessmen pressed for dam construction in order to generate cheaper power from hydroelectric sources. William Maxwell Aitken, later with R. B. Bennett, formed Calgary Power Company in 1910. That year, on property purchased from the Nakoda, Calgary Power began constructing Alberta's first major hydroelectric plant, Horseshoe Dam.

Calgary Power had problems before this dam was completed in 1911. The Bow River originates from a northern mountain, and its flow varies considerably depending upon the amount and location of winter snowfalls. A comprehensive study of the Bow's flow measurements had not been conducted. In its operations, Calgary Power relied upon estimates of the river's minimum flow during winter conditions. Thus, despite the amount of energy the company had contracted, it could not reliably fulfill these obligations during winters. With capital already invested in Horseshoe, Calgary Power opened another hydroelectric plant and reservoir two years later at Kananaskis Falls just upstream from Horseshoe Falls. A storage reservoir was also created within Banff National Park in 1912 at Lake Minnewanka. Despite this additional reservoir and both plants, Calgary Power still struggled to fulfill its power contracts during winter months. In the 1920s, the company began planning new projects to control the Bow River.

The Bow River's hydroelectric development both conforms to and contrasts with elements of conservationist ideology in the United States during this era. This ideology espoused that rational and planned resource development guided by technicians should benefit the greatest number of people possible. In this light, rivers could be seen as a series of interdependent parts, and engineering all of them could give technicians control over the system as a whole for the benefit of society.

In this process, Calgary Power ultimately fulfilled conservationist ideology as it increasingly brought the Bow River's interdependent sectors, and thus it as a whole, under control, while failing to embody conservationist ideals of rationally developing the Bow initially. Also in line with conservationism, bureaucrats allowing the construction of the Minnewanka reservoir espoused that the nation's development as a whole superseded the need to protect a small part of Banff National Park's nature.

Calgary Power's ad hoc hydroelectric development of the Bow continued. Ghost Dam was built in 1929; a major development on the Bow's tributary, Spray River, was completed in 1951; and, at the behest of the provincial government, Bearspaw Dam was built in 1954 just west of Calgary to control flooding (the dam included a generating station) and 1955 saw the development of two reservoirs on the Kananaskis River in what is now Peter Lougheed Provincial Park World War II's industrial demand increased pressure on the river: another hydroelectric development was built within Banff National Park, this time on the Cascade River, a tributary of the Bow.

Between 1910 and 1960, the Bow River was radically changed as it was systematically engineered to control its water flow and provide hydroelectric power. The seasonal summer flooding in Calgary was an issue of the past. Water was held by reservoirs during spring and summer, permitting steady power generation during fall and winter. Comparing 1924–33 to 1954–63, the Bow River's January flow had approximately doubled 30 years later. Parts of the river, such as that preceding Ghost Dam, had practically turned into lakes. These developments had ecological effects, too. For example, reservoirs allowed certain fish species, such as the brown trout, to outcompete others, while other species virtually disappeared.

Environmentalism

By the 1950s, the Bow River's south bank in Calgary was a generally derelict commercial zone. The Calgary Local Council of Women was the most vocal advocate for turning this area into a park system as a part of a broader campaign for improved public and social services. Calgary City Council agreed to the idea in 1955, but by 1959 little progress had been made to fund the project. To accommodate increasing traffic flow through the growing city, the Canadian Pacific Railway and the city began negotiating a CPR reroute that would follow the south bank of the Bow River, turning it into a parkway and the CPR's rail mainline. Among the plan's critics was the Local Council of Women, reminding the city of its 1955 promise for a river park. After negotiations between the CPR and Calgary ended in failure in 1964, urban elites, such as golf clubs, increasingly endorsed the Local Council of Women's idea for a riverfront park system.

Park advocates defined the Bow River within Calgary as the city's nature: it was something to be protected for and enjoyed by the public. However, as progress was made in the parks' creation, this "environmental" view of the Bow's nature proved selective. For example, trees were not to be cut down, but landscaping to accommodate cyclists was endorsed. In short, the river was valued above all when it suited human goals. Calgary eventually developed an extensive plan for the Bow River's park system, and it is considered an important element of Calgary's self-image today.

The grassroots advocacy done by the Local Council of Women denotes emerging environmental sensibilities that are representative of larger trends occurring in North America during this period. Samuel Hays associated such movements with the emergence of an advanced consumer society. Unlike the pre-World War II elitist ideology of conservationist production, this emergent approach in North America was of grassroots consumers democratically engaging in environmental issues, and there was often tension between the public and managers of the environment.

After an Alberta Environment official discovered a toxic "blob" in the Bow in October 1989, human needs again were given priority. Its discovery caused alarm in the media and amongst those living along the Bow River (two years earlier, 70 percent of Calgarians reported using the Bow recreationally).

As a result, Alberta's premier, Ralph Klein, established the Bow River Water Quality Council as a provincial advisory body. The council was to promote awareness of the river's water quality and try to improve it through fact-finding and aiding inter-institutional coordination. It was composed of representatives from diverse interests such as First Nations, agriculture, and municipalities. Recreational groups represented on the council, such as Ducks Unlimited and Bow Waters Canoe Club, expressed concern for the river's environment. Their attitudes were not strictly human-centric, but, like those favoring a park system in Calgary, they defined the Bow River's environment as something worth preserving for human use.

Greater changes in attitude toward the river were manifest in the Bow River Water Quality Council's reports over time. By 1994, the reports emphasized the importance of the Bow's ecological balance as a whole for maintaining its water quality and quantity. In the mid-1990s, the upper Bow River began being treated explicitly biocentrically. This was part of the larger pursuit of treating Banff National Park's ecosystems as something intrinsically valuable: maintaining these ecosystems was now prioritized over human enjoyment of the parks.

2013 floods
In June 2013, southern Alberta had such heavy rainfall that catastrophic flooding occurred throughout much of the southern half of the province along the Bow, Elbow, Highwood and Oldman rivers and tributaries. A dozen municipalities declared local states of emergency on June 20 as water levels rose, and numerous communities were placed under evacuation orders.

Banff

Designation as a national park
In 1887 the Canadian parliament, under the urging of the Canadian Pacific Railway vice-president, William Van Horne, and the federal land agent, William Pearce, created Rocky Mountain Park, later to become known as Banff National Park.  Originally , the park was Canada's first national park and included the Bow River. Eventually the park grew to include the Bow Glacier, an outflow of the Wapta Icefield and the source of the Bow River.

The designation of Banff as a national park marked a turning point in the public's perception of the Bow River. The river began to be appreciated for its aesthetic value in addition to its industrial and agricultural uses. Officials of the Canadian Pacific Railway, the company who led the development of Banff, realized this element. When work began on a new luxury hotel in Banff in 1886–87, Van Horne personally redesigned and reoriented the plans so that the guests of the hotel would be able to see the vista of the Bow River. Many early postcards from Banff, as well as some current ones, prominently featured the Bow River.

Sustainability as a national park

From the 1920s forward, the National Parks of Canada began to focus on the economic benefits of accessible, mass marketable tourism. Changes included new highways and the creation of storage reservoirs for the water needed to sustain the burgeoning community. The Bow River was now seen both for its aesthetic qualities and for new utilitarian aspects.

By the 1950s Banff's raw sewage began to be discharged into the Bow River. Because of the self-purification powers of the cold, braided water, however, the Bow was incredibly effective as a natural sewage-treatment facility. Tourists and residents were often unaware of the transformation of the Bow River into a sewage system.

As Banff continued to grow, the river continued to digest the increased volume of sewage. This practice, however, began to touch an ideological nerve among the tourists and residents of Banff. Pouring raw sewage into one of the main attractions of the park polluted both the river and, more importantly, the image of Banff. There was also fear that continued reliance on the Bow as a natural sewer would either cap the development of Banff or eventually have great risk to public health. By the 1960s, the town built a modern sewage facility and stopped releasing untreated waters into the Bow. The river's aesthetic qualities had increasing priority in terms of effects of development within the borders of a National Park.

Irrigation and development
The Bow river contains seven dams and weirs on its main stream and ten other dams on its tributaries. In response to the 2013 Alberta floods a new reservoir storage is being proposed on the river. Three options are being considered including a new dam near Morley, an expanded Ghost Dam or a new dam near Glenbow.

The Bow River supplies the water for three irrigation districts in southern Alberta: the Eastern, Western, and Bow River irrigation districts.

Eastern Irrigation District
The Eastern Irrigation District (EID), headquartered in Brooks, Alberta, was originally part of land that the federal government granted to the Canadian Pacific Railway in lieu of a portion of the payment for the construction of the railway. In 1929 the CPR split the property into two parts and divested itself of both sections. In 1935 a delegation of irrigation farmers took control of the eastern section and established the EID.

The EID, diverting its water at the Bassano and Newell dams, is the largest private land owner in Alberta. Recently the EID began promoting the recreational possibilities that have developed alongside the district's irrigation development. The EID currently owns and operates the Rolling Hills Reservoir Campground.  In 1951, the Province of Alberta also established Kinbrook Island Provincial Park on the eastern bank of the Newell reservoir, which has been stocked with native species of fish.

Western Irrigation District
The Western Irrigation District (WID), headquartered in Strathmore, Alberta, was the second half of the land divested by the CPR.  The WID was established in 1944.

The water of the WID, diverted at the Calgary Weir, is instrumental to southern Alberta agriculture and, unlike the other two districts, supports the urban needs city of Calgary. It is able to supply both agricultural and urban needs since the WID has higher levels of rainfall than the other two districts, and it receives much of Calgary's storm water.

Bow River Irrigation District
The Bow River Irrigation District (BRID), headquartered in Vauxhall, Alberta, was created in 1968, making it the most recent district to be supplied by the Bow.  The BRID diverts the Bow at the Carseland weir and also uses the McGregor, Travers, and Little Bow dams. Each has a reservoir that is also used for recreational purposes.

An expansion of  passed in 2004 as well. This means that, for the second time in eight years, the BRID will increase its demand on the Bow River by roughly 10 percent.

Irrigation today
Of the 45 crops that are grown in the Bow River basin, only 10 could be produced without irrigation.

Because of the dependence of the region on Bow River irrigation water, in the early 21st century all three irrigation districts began to make major changes in order to continue to serve their large mandated areas. In 2006, as a part of the "Water for Life Initiative", the Alberta government placed a moratorium on any new licenses for water use from the Bow, Oldman, and South Saskatchewan River basins. The government also requested that the three irrigation districts increase their efficiency by 30 percent.  The irrigation districts are improving their irrigation system by changing most canals to pipelines in order to decrease contamination, spillage, and loss of water to evaporation. A drawback of this change is that trees must be cleared in order to prevent roots from damaging the pipeline, changing the habitat.

in 1987 the EID in association with the Alberta Fish and Wildlife Division and Ducks Unlimited Canada established a partnership to create additional wildlife habitat within the Eastern Irrigation District's boundaries.  This demonstrated the EID's goal of encouraging wildlife in order to contribute to the growth of its tourist sector. Hunting and fishing are now promoted on the EID's website.

Recreation

The Bow River provides habitat for wildlife and many opportunities for recreation such as fishing and boating. Both fly fishermen and spinner fishermen share the river in all four seasons of the year. Serious anglers from all over the world visit the Bow River for its thriving population of brown trout and rainbow trout. The Bow River holds a resident population of rainbow and brown trout that has one of the best growth rates to be found on any river system in the world today. Mainly the river is fished south of the city of Calgary, past where the water treatment sites dump into the river. The volume of nutrients and number of fish are higher there.

Outdoor adventurers use primarily three types of boats to enjoy the river, the inflatable boat, the Jon boat and the canoe. There are several spots located on the river to launch watercraft, including Graves Landing, Highway 22X Bridge, Policeman's Flats and McKinnon Flats.

The Bow River pathway, is developed on both banks of the river throughout the city of Calgary and is used for cycling, hiking, jogging, as well as rollerblading and skateboarding. Along the Bow River pathway, many people partake in canoeing, kayaking, rafting, paddle boarding, and other activities on the water. Dog owners and families often use the river banks and beaches for outdoor recreation.

Recreation and industrial development
The recreation and tourism sector of the Bow developed closely alongside the river's water irrigation projects. Projects such as the McGregor, Chestermere, and Ghost dams were originally built for either agricultural or electrical purposes but are also important for the recreational facilities they offer. Since their construction, the dams along the Bow River have played a central role in the development of the adjacent communities.

Two key examples that demonstrate the connection of recreation and tourism with irrigation are the Chestermere and Basano dams. Following the construction of the Chestermere Dam in 1907, housing developments began to occur around the neighbouring lake and in 1992, because of these developments, Chestermere was declared a town. At this point the Bassano dam now also started offering group tours, fishing and picnic areas, and a scenic viewpoint.

Communities have also recently begun to appear around Ghost Dam as well.

Calgary's weir project (Harvie Passage)
In 1904 the Bow River Weir was constructed close to Calgary's downtown core in order to divert water into the Western Irrigation District.  Since its construction a side effect of the weir had been that it created a circulating wave, with a lethal and powerful undertow,  immediately downstream of it. Because rafting, canoeing, and kayaking down the Bow River are such popular summer activities, there had been many fatalities. Furthermore, because fish were not able to pass through the structure, they too became trapped in the circulating wave and a dense, unnatural concentration of pelicans congregated immediately following the weir.

In order to combat the circulating wave and undertow, in August 2007 the Province of Alberta through the Alberta Lottery fund, in conjunction with the Calgary Foundation and the City of Calgary, began construction of the Bow River Weir paddle around, named the Harvie Passage.  The passage allowed for the wave to be dispersed over a set of several smaller rapids while still supplying water to its irrigation district. Altogether, the paddle around cost $18 million and was completed in the spring of 2012.

In June 2013, just a year after the project was completed, Calgary was hit with an epic 100 year flood, and all of the Harvie Passage work was destroyed. After that flood, the passage was closed to the public and a safety boom ahead of the rapids was re-installed. It was estimated that rebuilding the Harvie Passage to the original intent of the project (completed in 2012) would cost $23.4 million.

By 2021, construction on the Harvie Passage was complete. The passage was redesigned to withstand a flood similar to the one that damaged the previous structures.

Ecology
An invasive species known as Didymosphenia geminata, a type of algae commonly called "rock snot", is threatening the stocked exotic invasive brown trout stocks.

Tributaries

Banff National Park
Mosquito Creek
Noseeum Creek
Missing Lake
Pipestone River
Molar Creek, Little Pipestone Creek
Paradise Creek
Corral Creek
Moraine Creek
Baker Creek
Wildflower Creek
Taylor Creek
Silverton Creek
Altrude Creek
Johnston Creek
Redearth Creek
Pharaoh Creek
Wolverine Creek
Ranger Creek
Healy Creek
Brewster Creek, Howard Douglas Creek, Fatigue Creek
Sundance Creek
Forty Mile Creek
Spray River
Cascade River
Carrot Creek

Foothills and plains
Policeman Creek
Cougar Creek
Three Sisters Creek
Stewart Creek
Wind Creek
Pigeon Creek
Grotto Creek
Exshaw Creek
Heart Creek
Jura Creek
Kananaskis River
Joshua Creek
Chiniki Creek
Jacob Creek
Ghost River
Spencer Creek
Beaupre Creek
Grand Valley Creek
McClennan Creek
Horse Creek
Jumpingpound Creek
Towers Creek, Pile of Bones Creek, Park Creek
Bighill Creek
Elbow River
Nose Creek
West Nose Creek
W.I.D. Canal
Pine Creek
Highwood River
Arrowwood Creek
Crowfoot River
Matzhiwin Creek

Many lakes, glacial and artificial are found in the Bow Valley: Bow Lake, Hector Lake, Vermilion Lakes, Gap Lake, Lac des Arcs, and Ghost Lake on the upper course, and a few man-made reservoirs along the lower course.

Further reading
Christopher Armstrong, Matthew Evenden, and H.V. Nelles. The River Returns: An Environmental History of the Bow (Toronto: McGill-Queen's University Press, 2009)

Gallery

See also
 List of rivers of Alberta

References

Further reading

External links
Bow River Basin Council

 
Rivers of Alberta
Banff National Park
Rivers of the Canadian Rockies
Tributaries of Hudson Bay